GP Transco is an American trucking company known for providing transportation and logistics services in the United States and Canada.

History 
GP Transco was founded on June 30, 2006, by Gedas Poviliunas, in Illinois, United States. The company was headquartered in Darien before moving to its new headquarter in Joliet, Illinois, in 2020.

In 2019, the company launched a program to reward its top fifty percent of drivers with a salary bonus each month based on fuel efficiency.

In 2020, GP Transco partnered with Samsara Telematics Solutions to deploy their IoT platform that included dashboard cameras and AI to monitor drivers and streamline operations. In the same year, the company built its cloud-based transportation management system platform, OpenRoad TMS.

GP Transco was named as the best trucking company to work for in 2021 by Smart-Trucking and ranked on the list of privately held companies for growth on Inc. 5000. The company was also named as the "top fleet to drive" for by Samsara in its annual fleet awards. It has been recognized and listed on several platforms for its management systems and services.

References

External links
 Official website

American companies established in 2006
Companies based in Illinois
Trucking companies of the United States